José Macedo Sánchez is a Peruvian politician and a Congressman representing Ucayali for the 2006–2011 term. Macedo belongs to the Peruvian Aprista Party.

External links
Official Congressional Site

Living people
American Popular Revolutionary Alliance politicians
Members of the Congress of the Republic of Peru
Year of birth missing (living people)
Place of birth missing (living people)